Harpalus caeruleatus is a species of ground beetle in the subfamily Harpalinae. It was described by Henry Walter Bates in 1878.

References

caeruleatus
Beetles described in 1878